The 1997 Japanese motorcycle Grand Prix was the second round of the 1997 Grand Prix motorcycle racing season. It took place on 20 April 1997 at the Suzuka Circuit.

500 cc classification

250 cc classification

125 cc classification

References

Japanese motorcycle Grand Prix
Japanese
Motorcycle Grand Prix